Spender is a surname. Notable people with the name include:

Dale Spender (born 1943), Australian feminist and writer
Elizabeth Spender, English film actress
Emily Spender, English novelist
Humphrey Spender (1910–2005), British photographer, painter and designer
Jeffrey Spender (judge), Australian judge
Jérémy Spender (born 1982), French footballer
John Spender (1935–2022), Australian politician and barrister
John Alfred Spender (1862–1942), British journalist and newspaper editor
Lillian Spender (1835–1895), English novelist
Mary Spender (born 1990), British singer-songwriter, guitarist and YouTube personality
Michael Spender (1906–1945), English explorer
Nancy Spender (1909–2001), English painter
Natasha Spender (1919–2010), English pianist and author
Percy Spender (1897–1985), Australian politician, diplomat and jurist
Philip Spender (born 1943), English public-sector fundraiser
Simon Spender (born 1985), Welsh footballer
Stephen Spender (1909–1995), British poet, novelist and essayist
Wilfrid Spender (1876–1960), British army officer
Herbert Henry Spender-Clay (1875–1937), English soldier and Conservative Party politician

Fictional
C.G.B. Spender, fictional character in the American television series The X-Files
Cassandra Spender, fictional character in The X-Files
Freddie Spender, fictional detective in the British television series Spender
Jeffrey Spender, fictional character in The X-Files